Evansburg may refer to:
 Evansburg, Pennsylvania
 Evansburg, Alberta
 Evansburg railway station